The Reay Boathouse is located in Three Lakes, Wisconsin, United States. It was added to the National Register of Historic Places in 2004.

Description
The boathouse is two stories tall. It features boat slips on the lower level and a recreation room on the upper level.

References

Boathouses in the United States
Buildings and structures completed in 1928
Buildings and structures in Oneida County, Wisconsin
National Register of Historic Places in Oneida County, Wisconsin
Boathouses on the National Register of Historic Places in Wisconsin